The Journal of Mathematical Physics is a peer-reviewed journal published monthly by the American Institute of Physics devoted to the publication of papers in mathematical physics. The journal was first published bimonthly beginning in January 1960; it became a monthly publication in 1963. The current editor is Jan Philip Solovej from University of Copenhagen. Its 2018 Impact Factor is 1.355

Abstracting and indexing
This journal is indexed by the following services:

References

External links
 Journal of Mathematical Physics online

Mathematics journals
Physics journals
American Institute of Physics academic journals
Publications established in 1960
English-language journals